The Gundaroo Catholic Pioneer Cemetery is on the Sutton Road opposite the beginning of Back Creek Road a few kilometres south of Gundaroo, New South Wales, Australia.

A plaque at the entranceway reads:

This cemetery was gifted to the Catholic community by Donald Roderick Macleod, a Presbyterian.
The Reverend Gilliard Smith was refusing to bury non-Anglicans at the burial ground at Upper Gundaroo, attached to the Anglican Church of St. Luke.
The earliest burials here were in 1857 of Mary Hughes and Mugwill & Bridget Donnelly of Bywong.
Burials included non-Catholics.
Many Catholic pioneer families such as Massy, Leahy, Booth, Donnelly & Hughes are represented.

References

External links
 Cemetery description, including a cemetery plan and transcript of headstone inscriptions

Roman Catholic cemeteries in Australia
Cemeteries in New South Wales
1857 establishments in Australia